The economic liberalisation in India refers to the opening of the country's economy to the world with the goal of making the economy more market and service-oriented, thus expanding the role of private and foreign investment.  Indian economic liberalisation was part of a general pattern of economic liberalisation occurring across the world in the late 20th century. Although some attempts at liberalisation were made in 1966 and the early 1980s, a more thorough liberalisation was initiated in 1991. The reform was prompted by a balance of payments crisis that had led to a severe recession and also as per structural adjustment programs for taking loans from IMF and World Bank.

Specific changes included reducing import tariffs, deregulating markets, and reducing taxes, which led to an increase in foreign investment and high economic growth in the 1990s and 2000s. From 1992 to 2005, foreign investment increased 316.9%, and India's gross domestic product (GDP) grew from $266 billion in 1991 to $2.3 trillion in 2018 According to one study, wages rose on the whole, as well as wages as the labor-to-capital relative share. 

As an effect of the liberalisation in 1991, extreme poverty reduced from 36 percent in 1993-94 to 24.1 percent in 1999-2000.

India also increasingly integrated its economy with the global economy. The ratio of total exports of goods and services to GDP in India approximately doubled from 7.3 percent in 1990 to 14 percent in 2000. This rise was less dramatic on the import side but was significant, from 9.9 percent in 1990 to 16.6 percent in 2000. Within 10 years, the ratio of total goods and services trade to GDP rose from 17.2 percent to 30.6 percent.

The liberalisation policies of the Indian government have been criticized for increasing income inequality, concentrating wealth, worsening rural living standards, causing unemployment, and leading to an increase in farmer suicides.

Pre-liberalisation policies

Indian economic policy after independence was influenced by the colonial experience (which was exploitative in nature) and by those leaders', particularly prime minister Nehru's exposure to Fabian socialism. Under the Congress party governments of Nehru, and his successors  policy tended towards protectionism, with a strong emphasis on import substitution industrialization under state monitoring, state intervention at the micro level in all businesses especially in labour and financial markets, a large public sector, business regulation, and central planning. Five-Year Plans of India resembled central planning in the Soviet Union. Under the Industrial Development Regulation Act of 1951, steel, mining, machine tools, water, telecommunications, insurance, and electrical plants, among other industries, were effectively nationalised. Elaborate licences, regulations and the accompanying red tape, commonly referred to as Licence Raj, were required to set up business in India between 1947 and 1990. The Indian economy of this period is characterised as Dirigism.

Licence Raj established an "irresponsible, self-perpetuating bureaucracy" and corruption flourished under this system. Only four or five licences would be given for steel, electrical power and communications, allowing license owners to build huge and powerful empires without competition. A huge public sector emerged, allowing state-owned enterprises to incur record losses without being shut down. Controls on business creation also led to poor infrastructure development. During the brief rule by the Janata party in late 1970s, the government seeking to promote economic self-reliance and indigenous industries,  required multi-national corporations to go into partnership with Indian corporations. The policy proved controversial, diminishing foreign investment and led to the high-profile exit of corporations such as Coca-Cola and IBM from India.

By 1980, this had created widespread economic stagnation. The annual growth rate of the Indian economy had stagnated around 3.5% from the 1950s to 1980s, while per-capita income growth averaged 1.3%.

Reforms before 1991

1966 liberalisation attempt 
In 1966, due to rapid inflation caused by an increasing budget deficit accompanying the Sino-Indian War and severe drought, the Indian government was forced to seek monetary aid from the International Monetary Fund (IMF) and World Bank. Pressure from aid donors caused a shift towards economic liberalisation, wherein the rupee was devalued to combat inflation and cheapen exports and the former system of tariffs and export subsidies was abolished. However, a second poor harvest and subsequent industrial recession helped fuel political backlash against liberalisation, characterised by resentment at foreign involvement in the Indian economy and fear that it might signal a broader shift away from socialist policies. As a result, trade restrictions were reintroduced and the Foreign Investments Board was established in 1968 to scrutinise companies investing in India with more than 40% foreign equity participation.

World Bank loans continued to be taken for agricultural projects since 1972, and these continued as international seed companies that were able to enter Indian markets after the 1991 liberalisation.

Economic reforms during the 1980s 
As it became evident that the Indian economy was lagging behind its East and Southeast Asian neighbours, the governments of Indira Gandhi and subsequently Rajiv Gandhi began pursuing economic liberalisation. The governments loosened restrictions on business creation and import controls while also promoting the growth of the automobile, digitalization, telecommunications and software industries. Reforms under lead to an increase in the average GDP growth rate from 2.9 percent in the 1970s to 5.6 per cent, although they failed to fix systemic issues with the Licence Raj. Despite Rajiv Gandhi's dream for more systemic reforms, the Bofors scandal tarnished his government's reputation and impeded his liberalisation efforts.

Chandra Shekhar Singh reforms 

The Chandra Shekhar government (1990–91) took several significant steps towards liberalisation and laid its foundation.

Liberalisation of 1991

Crisis leading to reforms 

By 1991, India still had a fixed exchange rate system, where the rupee was pegged to the value of a basket of currencies of major trading partners. India started having balance of payments problems in 1985, and by the end of 1990, the state of India was in a serious economic crisis. The government was close to default, its central bank had refused new credit, and foreign exchange reserves had reduced to the point that India could barely finance two weeks' worth of imports.

Liberalisation of 1991 
The collapse of the Chandra Shekhar government in the midst of the crisis and the assassination of Rajiv Gandhi led to the election of a new Congress government led by P. V. Narasimha Rao. He selected Amar Nath Verma to be his Principal Secretary and Manmohan Singh to be finance minister and gave them complete support in doing whatever they thought was necessary to solve the crisis. Verma helped draft the New Industrial Policy alongside Chief Economic Advisor Rakesh Mohan, and it laid out a plan to foster Indian industry in five points. Firstly, it abolished the License Raj by removing licensing restrictions for all industries except for 18 that "related to security and strategic concerns, social reasons, problems related to safety and overriding environmental issues." To incentivise foreign investment, it laid out a plan to pre-approve all investment up to 51% foreign equity participation, allowing foreign companies to bring modern technology and industrial development. To further incentivise technological advancement, the old policy of government approval for foreign technology agreements was scrapped. The fourth point proposed to dismantle public monopolies by floating shares of public sector companies and limiting public sector growth to essential infrastructure, goods and services, mineral exploration, and defense manufacturing. Finally the concept of an MRTP company, where companies whose assets surpassed a certain value were placed under government supervision, was scrapped.

Meanwhile, Manmohan Singh worked on a new budget that would come to be known as the Epochal Budget. The primary concern was getting the fiscal deficit under control, and he sought to do this by curbing government expenses. Part of this was the disinvestment in public sector companies, but accompanying this was a reduction in subsidies for fertilizer and abolition of subsidies for sugar. He also dealt with the depletion of foreign exchange reserves during the crisis with a 19 per cent devaluation of the rupee with respect to the US dollar, a change which sought to make exports cheaper and accordingly provide the necessary foreign exchange reserves. The devaluation made petroleum more expensive to import, so Singh proposed to lower the price of kerosene to benefit the poorer citizens who depended on it while raising petroleum prices for industry and fuel. On 24 July 1991, Manmohan Singh presented the budget alongside his outline for broader reform. During the speech he laid out a new trade policy oriented towards promoting exports and removing import controls. Specifically, he proposed limiting tariff rates to no more than 150 percent while also lowering rates across the board, reducing excise duties, and abolishing export subsidies.

In August 1991, the Reserve Bank of India (RBI) Governor established the Narasimham Committee to recommend changes to the financial system. Recommendations included reducing the statutory liquidity ratio (SLR) and cash reserve ratio (CRR) from 38.5% and 15% respectively to 25% and 10% respectively, allowing market forces to dictate interest rates instead of the government, placing banks under the sole control of the RBI, and reducing the number of public sector banks. The government heeded some of these suggestions, including cutting the SLR and CRR rates, liberalizing interest rates, loosening restrictions on private banks, and allowing banks to open branches free from government mandate.

On 12 November 1991, based on an application from the Government of India, World Bank sanctioned a structural adjustment loan/credit that consisted of two components – an IBRD loan of $250 million to be paid over 20 years, and an IDA credit of SDR 183.8 million (equivalent to $250 million) with 35 years maturity, through India's ministry of finance, with the President of India as the borrower. The loan was meant primarily to support the government's program of stabilization and economic reform. This specified deregulation, increased foreign direct investment, liberalisation of the trade regime, reforming domestic interest rates, strengthening capital markets (stock exchanges), and initiating public enterprise reform (selling off public enterprises). As part of a bailout deal with the IMF, India was forced to pledge 20 tonnes of gold to Union Bank of Switzerland and 47 tonnes to the Bank of England and Bank of Japan.

The reforms drew heavy scrutiny from opposition leaders. The New Industrial Policy and 1991 Budget was decried by opposition leaders as "command budget from the IMF" and worried that withdrawal of subsidies for fertilizers and hikes in oil prices would harm lower and middle-class citizens. Critics also derided devaluation, fearing it would worsen runaway inflation that would hit the poorest citizens the hardest while doing nothing to fix the trade deficit. In the face of vocal opposition, the support and political will of the prime minister was crucial in order to see through the reforms. Rao was often referred to as Chanakya for his ability to steer tough economic and political legislation through the parliament at a time when he headed a minority government.

Impact

Reforms led to the achievement of recognizable increases in international competitiveness in a number of sectors including auto components, telecommunications, software, pharmaceuticals, biotechnology, research and development, and professional services provided by scientists, technologists, doctors, nurses, teachers, management professionals and similar professions.

Foreign investment in the country (including foreign direct investment, portfolio investment, and investment raised on international capital markets) increased from US$132 million in 1991–92 to $5.3 billion in 1995–96.

Poverty reduced from 36 percent in 1993-94 to 26.1 percent in 1999-00. Within 10 years, the ratio of total goods and services trade to GDP rose from 17.2 percent to 30.6 percent.

After the reforms, life expectancy and literacy rates continued to increase at roughly the same rate as before the reforms. For the first 10 years after the 1991 reforms, GDP also continued to increase at roughly the same rate as before the reforms.

However, the average annual growth rates in GDP, post the 1990s has shown a significant increase, having been around 6.25 per cent against 4.18 per cent for the three decades prior to the reforms.

Liberalisation did not affect all parts of India equally. Urban residents have benefited more than rural residents. An analysis of the effects of liberalisation across multiple Indian states found that states with pro-worker labor laws saw slower industry expansion than those with pro-employer labor laws, as industries moved towards states with friendlier business climates.
By 1997, it became evident that no governing coalition would try to dismantle liberalisation, although governments avoided taking on powerful lobbies such as trade unions and farmers on contentious issues such as reforming labour laws and reducing agricultural subsidies. By the turn of the 21st century, India had progressed towards a free-market economy, with a substantial reduction in state control of the economy and increased financial liberalisation.

Institutions like the OECD which promote neoliberal free-market economics applauded the changes:

In 2006 India recorded its highest GDP growth rate of 9.6%  becoming the second fastest growing major economy in the world, next only to China. The growth rate has slowed significantly in the first half of 2012.

The economy then rebounded to 7.3% growth in 2015, 7.9% in 2015 and 8.2% in 2016 before falling to 6.7% in 2017, 6.5% in 2018 and 4% in 2019.

Later reforms

The United Front government attempted a progressive budget that encouraged reforms, but the 1997 Asian financial crisis and political instability created economic stagnation.

The Atal Bihari Vajpayee administration continued liberal reforms. NDA Coalition began privatizing government-owned business including hotels, VSNL, Maruti Suzuki, and airports. The coalition also began reducing taxes, enacted a fiscal policy aimed at reducing deficits and debts and increased initiatives for public works.

Towards the end of 2011, the second UPA Coalition Government led by Manmohan Singh initiated the introduction of 51% Foreign Direct Investment in retail sector. But due to pressure from coalition parties and the opposition, the decision was delayed. It was later approved in December 2012.

The second NDA Government also opened up the coal industry through the passing of the Coal Mines (Special Provisions) Bill of 2015. It effectively ended the state monopoly over the mining of coal sector and opened up the for private, foreign investments, as well as private sector mining of coal.

In the 2016 budget session of Parliament, the Narendra Modi led NDA Government pushed through the Insolvency and Bankruptcy Code to create time-bound processes for insolvency resolution of companies and individuals.

On 1 July 2017, the NDA Government under Modi approved Goods and Services Tax Act after the legislation was first proposed 17 years earlier under the NDA Government in 2000 to replace multiple indirect taxes with a unified tax structure.

On 20 September 2019 Finance Minister Nirmala Sitharaman announced reduction of the base corporate tax rate from 30% to 22%  for companies that do not seek exemptions, and reduced the rate for new manufacturing companies from 25% to 15%.

This was followed with proposal of agricultural and labour reforms in 2020.

Criticisms 
The liberalisation of the Indian economy was followed by a large increase in inequality with the income share of the top 10% of the population increasing from 35% in 1991 to 57.1% in 2014. Likewise, the income share of the bottom 50% decreased from 20.1% in 1991 to 13.1% in 2014. It has also been criticised for decreasing rural living standards, rural employment and an increase in farmer suicides.

Poverty continues to persist in India, before the COVID-19 pandemic there were 59 million Indians living below $2 a day and 1,162 million living between $2.01 and $10 a day.

Low government expenditure on healthcare has resulted in a healthcare quality divide between rich and poor as well as between the rural and urban population.

Environmental issues such as pollution which GDP doesn't account for has also worsened.

After 1991, the Indian government removed some restrictions on imports of agricultural products causing a price crash while cutting subsidies for the farmers to keep government intervention to the minimum as per neoliberal ideals causing further farmer distress.

2020-2021 Indian farmers' protests forced the Indian government to repeal three laws meant to further liberalise Indian agriculture sector.

India is highly dependent on indirect taxes, especially the tax levied on the sale and manufacture of goods and services that ordinary Indians depend upon.

Neoliberal policies may also have a negative impact on labor rights, as they promote flexible and casualised forms of employment, which may not provide the same protections and benefits as permanent jobs.

Neoliberal reforms may also have had a negative impact on small businesses and traditional industries, as they may struggle to compete with larger, more efficient companies.

The privatisation of public services under neoliberal policies may lead to a loss of access or quality of these services for certain segments of the population, especially those who cannot afford to pay for them.

The liberalization of the economy made India more vulnerable to global market forces, such as fluctuations in commodity prices, exchange rates and global demand for exports. This increased the country's dependence on global market forces, as it became more susceptible to external shocks and economic crises. A commonly cited example of this is the 2008 Financial Crisis; although the Indian banking sector had low exposure to US banking sector, the crisis still had a negative impact on the Indian economy due to lower global demand, decline in foreign investment and tightening of credit.

See also
 Economy of India
 Globalization in India
 Licence Raj
 Hindu rate of growth
 Economic miracle

References

Works cited

External links
 For a short educational video of the "economic history of India".
 
 
 
 
 

Economic history of India (1947–present)
Economy of India
Economic liberalization
Economic booms
History of the Republic of India
Rao administration
India
Reform in India
1991 in Indian economy